The Marist Red Foxes men's soccer team represents Marist College and competes in the Metro Atlantic Athletic Conference (MAAC) of NCAA Division I.

History
In the fall of 1981 Marist College added men's soccer to the athletic department.  This team would join the existing Marist teams already competing at the Division 1 Level.  The soccer team achieved immediate success with a record of twelve wins, six losses, and one tie. Since then Marist has had a number of successful years including in 2004. The team won four home games on its way to the MAAC Championship and NCAA tournament. The Red Foxes then repeated as MAAC Champions the following season and were admitted into the NCAA tournament for two consecutive years.

References

External links
 

 
1981 establishments in New York (state)
Association football clubs established in 1981